Robiquetia minimiflora, or the tiny-flowered abdominea, is a very rare monopodial epiphytic orchid species. It was previously known as the Abdominea minimiflora. It is distributed from Thailand to the Malay peninsula, Java, and the Philippines.

The name is derived from the Latin abdomen, meaning belly. It refers to the similarity between the shape of the labellum (lip) and the shape of the abdomen of an insect.

The species produces very small flowers, about 0.45 cm wide, on a racemose, many-flowered inflorescence.

References

External links 

IOSPE orchid photos Abdominea minimiflora 
Orchidiana, Abdominea minimiflora
Siam Exotica Plants, Orchid of Thailand, Abdominea สกุล แอ็บโดมีเนีย ตั้งชื่อโดย Johannes Jacobus Smith (J.J.Sm.)  นักพฤกษศาสตร์ ชาวเดนมาร์ก  เมื่อปี พ.ศ.2457 ซึ่งตั้งชื่อสกุลมาจากภาษาลาตินว่า abdomen หมายถึง จะงอยที่ยื่นยาวเหนือแอ่งเกสรตัวเมีย
Phytoimages, Jim Cootes, Orchidaceae Abdominea minimiflora
Les Orchidées de  sam, Abdominea

minimiflora
Epiphytic orchids
Orchids of Malaya
Orchids of Java
Orchids of the Philippines
Orchids of Thailand